Lalitpur City FC is a Nepali professional franchise football club based in Lalitpur, Bagmati Province, that competes in the Nepal Super League, the top flight football league in Nepal.

History
The club was formed in March 2021 after the establishment of Nepal Super League, the first ever franchise football league in Nepal, under the supervision of All Nepal Football Association (ANFA). The club played their first match on 24 April 2021 against Kathmandu Rayzrs.

2021 squad

2022 squad

Technical staff

Head coaching record

Sponsors

Team position by season
NSL, 2021: 3rd

References

2020–21 in Nepalese football
Lalitpur City FC
Association football clubs established in 2021
2021 establishments in Nepal
Nepal Super League
Football clubs in Nepal